Taipingxi Town ("Taiping Stream Town") is a town in Yiling District of Yichang Prefecture-level city of China's Hubei Province. It is located on the left (northern) side of the Yangtze River, near the northern end of the Three Gorges Dam.

As an administrative unit, Taipingxi occupies 152 square km (mostly, rural area), and has the population of 27,000 people.

Taipingxi town center is situated on the Three Gorges Reservoir, less than a kilometer north-west of the Three Gorges Dam's ship locks. An important river port, Taipingxi Harbor is adjacent to the town center.  This is the easternmost port facility on the Three Gorges Reservoir, the one closest to the dam.

The towns of Maoping and Sandouping are located on the opposite (southern) side of the river; Letianxi, on the same (northern) side, a few kilometers downstream. The Xiling Bridge crosses the river downstream of the dam, connecting Taipingxi with Sandouping.

Like many other towns in the Three Gorges Reservoir Region, Taipingxi houses many residents resettled from villages flooded by the reservoir.

Besides the economic activities connected to the Three Gorges Dam and the Yangtze River shipping, Taipingxi also has mining and tea plantations.

Administrative divisions
One residential community:
 Wuxiangmiao

Twelve villages:
 Xujiachong, Luofo, Longtanping, Fuchengping, Linjiaxi, Meirentuo, Xiaoxikou, Hanjiawan, Taipingxi, Changling, Huangjiachong, Gucunping

See also
List of township-level divisions of Hubei

References

External links
 Taipingxi Town Government 

Township-level divisions of Hubei
Geography of Yichang
Towns in China